This is a list of Croatian football transfers for the 2018 summer transfer window. Only transfers featuring Hrvatski Telekom Prva liga are listed.

Croatian First Football League

Note: Flags indicate national team as has been defined under FIFA eligibility rules. Players may hold more than one non-FIFA nationality.

Dinamo Zagreb

In:

Out:

Gorica

In:

Out:

Hajduk Split

In:

Out:

Inter Zaprešić

In:

Out:

Istra 1961

In:

Out:

Lokomotiva

In:

Out:

Osijek

In:

Out:

Rijeka

In:

Out:

Rudeš

In:

Out:

Slaven Belupo

In:

Out:

See also
 2018–19 Croatian First Football League

References

External links
 Official site of the Croatian Football Federation
 Official site of the Croatian First Football League

Football transfers summer 2018
Trans
2018
2017–18 in Croatian football